Stanisław Józef Dubois (9 January 1901 – 21 August 1942) was a Polish journalist and political activist in the Second Polish Republic, member of the left-wing Polish Socialist Party as well as the Youth Organisation of the Workers' University Society (Organizacja Młodzieży Towarzystwa Uniwersytetu Robotniczego).

Biography
He took part in the Third Silesian Uprising and in the Polish–Soviet War. Dubois was a creator of the Red Scouts (Czerwone Harcerstwo Towarzystwa Uniwersytetu Robotniczego). In years 1928–1933 he was a member of the Polish parliament Sejm, and a councillor in Warsaw from 1938. Dubois was a secretary in the editorial office of the Robotnik (the Worker) paper. As an opponent of Sanation he was charged in 1930 with the communist agitation in Lwów and sentenced in the Brest trials for 3 years in prison. He was held at the Brest Fortress and while imprisoned, ran in the 1930 Polish legislative election. He was released the following month.

His great-grandfather, Charles August Dubois, was a French officer of Napoleon's Grande Armée.

World War II
Dubois took part in the Polish resistance movement in World War II. He was arrested in 1940 in Warsaw and transported from the Pawiak prison to Auschwitz-Birkenau, where he conspired with Witold Pilecki to gather intelligence inside the camp. He was executed by the Germans in 1942.

Selected works 
 Stanisław Dubois, Dzień Młodzieży Robotniczej 1927
 Stanisław Dubois, Obrazki z niezbyt odległych okolic 1928
 Stanisław Dubois, Przemówienie w związku z pacyfikacją w Małopolsce wschodniej 1931
 Stanisław Dubois, W czerwonym Borysławiu 1931
 Stanisław Dubois, Przemówienie przeciwko cenzurze sanacyjnej 1932
 Stanisław Dubois, Przemówienie w dyskusji nad ustawą o szkołach akademickich 1933
 Stanisław Dubois, Pogrzeb krakowski. Ulica łzami zmyta... 1936
 Stanisław Dubois, Nie bardzo podłe miasto Mińsk Mazowiecki jak po oblężeniu 1936
 Stanisław Dubois, 300 milionów i 200 rodzin. Tylko 300 milionów. 1937
 Stanisław Dubois, Pod ciężkim jarzmem. Mniejszość polska w Niemczech 1938

See also 

List of Nazi-German concentration camps
The Holocaust in Poland
World War II casualties of Poland

References

External links
 Dubois Stanisław (1901–1942). Działacz socjalistyczny, publicysta.
 Portal IPN. Stefan Korboński, "Korzenie".

1901 births
1942 deaths
Writers from Warsaw
People from Warsaw Governorate
Polish people of French descent
Polish Socialist Party politicians
Members of the Sejm of the Second Polish Republic (1928–1930)
Members of the Sejm of the Second Polish Republic (1930–1935)
Polish people of the Polish–Soviet War
Silesian Uprisings participants
People of the Polish May Coup (pro-Piłsudski side)
Polish resistance members of World War II
Politicians who died in Nazi concentration camps
Polish people who died in Auschwitz concentration camp
20th-century Polish journalists